Lee Jae-yoon (born August 9, 1994), also known by his stage name Jae Yoon, is a South Korean singer, dancer, actor, and model. He is a member of the South Korean group SF9 as a lead vocalist and dancer. He is known for his vocal range, which he has showcased in solo contributions to various Korean drama original soundtracks (OSTs)  and live stage musicals.  

Lee trained to be a k-pop idol and performer in the talent company FNC Entertainment's rookie training program Neoz School. In 2016, he competed in the nine-member dance group NEOZ Dance on the Mnet survival reality show d.o.b.: Dance or Band, where he and his group mates competed for a chance to debut as FNC’s first boy dance group. They won the competition, and debuted as FNC’s first male dance group with the group name SF9 (short for Sensational Feeling 9). They released their first single "Fanfare" on October 5, 2016

As an actor, Lee began his career as a supporting role in the interactive web drama Click Your Heart (2016), and later played a lead character in the web drama Love in Black Hole (2021). He is best known for his acting in live stage musical productions, including Founded (2021), Another Miss Oh (2022), and Seopyeonje (2022). Lee joined Seopyeonje, a long-running, award-winning South Korean musical, in its final season, garnering media acclaim for his adaptability and growth as a musical actor.

Career

2015-2016: Debut with SF9 

In 2015, he was a part of a pre-debut team, “Neoz School”, under FNC Entertainment as a member of the group called NEOZ. In May 2016, he participated as a member of "NEOZ Dance" in FNC Entertainment's survival show d.o.b : Dance or Band, competing against NEOZ Band (later known as Honeyst). "NEOZ Dance" won the competition with 51% of the votes and received the opportunity to debut. He debuted with group SF9 on October 5, 2016 with their debut album Feeling Sensation, featuring their first single "Fanfare".

2017-present: Solo projects 
Alongside his active singing and performance career with SF9, Lee has worked to develop his performance skills as an individual, pursuing many acting, modelling, and independent music projects outside of his SF9 group activities. His voice has been featured on original soundtracks of several South Korea web and television dramas. 

In 2016 and 2017, he released two original soundtrack (OST) songs. The song Thank you, My love (also called Dear My Love) was featured in both the web drama Click your Heart (Episode 6, Zu Ho's ending) and the Netflix produced drama My Only Love Song. The song Even If We Meet Again (also called Again, We Meet) was featured in the television series Girls' Generation 1979. In 2021, he released the song My Universe on the OST for the web drama Love in Black Hole, in which he also appeared as a lead character. In 2022, Lee debuted his first self-composed song, Stay with Me, with live solo performances in Seoul during his group SF9's Delight concert tour. Lee later released this song as a solo track on SF9's 12th mini album THE PIECE OF9 in 2023. 

As an actor, he is best known for his live acting and performance projects in Seoul, South Korea. In 2021 and 2022, Lee played a lead role in the historical fiction musical Founded. In 2022, he played lead roles in the musicals, Another Miss Oh and Seopyeonje. In 2021 and 2022, Lee also played the role of a 'love clown' in a play called Fantastic Fairy Tale. 

Lee's commitment to health and fitness was featured in an interview published in Men's Health Magazine (Korean edition) in February 2021. He was also featured on the magazine cover of the same issue.

Personal life

Military service 
On February 13, 2023, FNC announced that Lee will enter mandatory military service on March 21, 2023, where he will attend basic training at the 3rd Infantry Division.

Discography

Singles

Filmography and Live theatre

Live theatre

Television series

Web series

Television shows

References

External links 

 

1996 births
Living people
SF9 (band) members
FNC Entertainment artists
21st-century South Korean male actors
South Korean male actors
South Korean male television actors
Male actors from Seoul
21st-century South Korean male singers
South Korean male idols
K-pop singers